Charles Eskridge may refer to:

 Charles Vernon Eskridge (1833–1900), American politician, lieutenant governor of Kansas
 Charles R. Eskridge III (born 1963), American judge